Michael Khodarkovsky is an American chess player, Chess Master, Chess Coach, FIDE Senior Trainer, and author.  Since 2018, Michael has been elected as FIDE Vice President, FIDE Presidential Board Member.

Since 1992 he has made his home in New Jersey. He is the Founder and Director of International Chess School, which conducts programs at public and private schools in New Jersey and New York, and sponsors youth programs worldwide.

Khodarkovsky is also the President of the Kasparov Chess Foundation, Chair of International Affairs Committee of the United States Chess Federation (USCF) and the USCF Delegate to FIDE. He served as Councilor of the FIDE Trainers Commission (2004 - 2014).  He was a member of Kasparov's coaching team during the 1995 and 2000 World Championship matches and during the 1996, 1997 matches versus IBM's computer Deep Blue. In 2004 he served as the head coach of the U.S. Women's Team, which won the Silver medal at the 36th World Chess Olympiad. He coached numerous State, National, Continental, and World Youth champions. In 2004 the New Jersey State Chess Federation named him Coach of the Year. In 2008 and 2010 years Khodarkovsky was Captain of the U.S. Women's Team, which won the Bronze medal at the 38th and tied for third at the 39th World Chess Olympiads respectively.  Michael was a coach of the 2005-2017 United States team at the World Youth Chess Championships.

Khodarkovsky is the winner of the 2008 Scholastic Service Award by the US Chess Federation. He is also the author of chess books, manuals, and articles published in USA, UK, Japan, South Korea, Greece, Russia, Ukraine, and Latvia.

The Early Years
Michael Khodarkovsky was born in Odessa, Ukraine, on July 21, 1958. Michael was a well known trainer of chess champions in the former Soviet Union prior to immigrating to the United States in 1992. He served as coach for grandmasters G. Zaitchik (2002 US Open Champion), V. Eingorn, and many others. From 1982 to 1992, he was a coach at the Chess Olympic School in Odessa. In 1985, he became the coach for the Ukrainian National Chess Team for the prestigious USSR Cup. In 1988, he was the coach for the winning Ukrainian Junior Team at the Grand Prix of Czechoslovakia in Prague. From 1990 to 1991, he was the chess consultant for chess clubs in Belgrade and Prague. Michael was also a popular chess columnist and he had his own columns in daily newspapers. His columns were named best chess columns in the country in 1985-1986.

Kasparov Chess Foundation
Between 1999 and 2000, Michael served as Chief Educational Content Officer at Kasparov Chess Online, created and managed the World Schools Chess Championships online.  In 2002, he became one of the founders and currently serves as President of the Kasparov Chess Foundation, a U.S. nonprofit organization that promotes chess in education worldwide.  The Kasparov Chess Foundation's Young Stars Program has helped develop several American chess prodigies.  Michael has also been instrumental in the development of the foundation's chess curriculum, which is now in more than 5000 schools in all 50 states throughout the United States.  The Foundation celebrated its 15th Anniversary on Nov. 9, 2017 with a gala at the New York Athletic Club.

Books

Michael Khodarkovsky (1997) A New Era: World Championship Chess in the Age of Deep Blue, Ballantine Books

Michael Khodarkovsky (2005), Gruenfeld Defense Revealed, Batsford, London, UK
Michael Khodarkovsky (2006), Teaching Chess Step By Step, Kasparov Chess Foundation
Michael Khodarkovsky (2014), Double Rook Endings, FIDE, Greece
Michael Khodarkovsky (2014), Chess GPS - Improvement of Your Position (Russian Edition), Wildside Press
Michael Khodarkovsky (2017), Chess GPS - Improvement of Your Position, Wildside Press

References

External links

 UsChessLeague
  USCF President Ruth Haring Wraps Up 82nd Fide Congress 
Kasparov Chess Foundation

1958 births
Living people
American chess players
Sportspeople from Odesa
Chess coaches
National team coaches